The rusty-breasted wheatear (Oenanthe frenata) is a species of bird in the Old World flycatcher family Muscicapidae that is found in montane Eritrea and Ethiopia.

The rusty-breasted wheatear was formerly considered to be a subspecies of the red-breasted wheatear(Oenanthe bottae)  which is now renamed the buff-breasted wheatear.

References

rusty-breasted wheatear
Birds of the Horn of Africa
rusty-breasted wheatear